Outlet Bay is an unincorporated community in Bonner County, Idaho, United States. The community is served by Idaho State Highway 57.

References

Unincorporated communities in Bonner County, Idaho
Unincorporated communities in Idaho